Meldon railway station was a stone built railway station with goods sidings in Northumberland on the Wansbeck Railway between Morpeth and Reedsmouth to the south of the village of Meldon.

History 

Due to financial difficulties the line was built in stages. At this time the Wansbeck Railway Company amalgamates with the North British Railway. It was only on 1 May 1865 that the line was completed. In 1923 the line and the North British Railway merged with the London and North Eastern Railway.

The station was opened in 1865. In September 1952 passenger services were withdrawn from the line, and the goods service from much of the line in November 1963. The line was closed completely on 3 October 1966. The station buildings remain as a private residence along with the platform.

References

External links 
Meldon Station on Northumbrian Railways
Meldon on a navigable 1956 O. S. map
The line on RailScot

Disused railway stations in Northumberland
Former North British Railway stations
Railway stations in Great Britain opened in 1862
Railway stations in Great Britain closed in 1952
1862 establishments in England